The Faculty of Veterinary Medicine is a Canadian veterinary school located in Calgary, Alberta at the University of Calgary.

The faculty was established in the wake of an outbreak of Bovine spongiform encephalopathy (BSE) traced to feedlots in Alberta from 1993 to 2005.  Prior to the establishment of the Faculty of Veterinary Medicine at the University of Calgary, the only veterinary school in western Canada was the Western College of Veterinary Medicine at the University of Saskatchewan.

External links
 University of Calgary Faculty of Veterinary Medicine

Calgary
University of Calgary
Educational institutions established in 2005
2005 establishments in Canada